Walkendorf is a municipality  in the Rostock district, in Mecklenburg-Vorpommern, Germany. The former municipalities Boddin and Lühburg were merged into Walkendorf in May 2019.

References 

Grand Duchy of Mecklenburg-Schwerin